Bram de Ly (born 21 January 1984) is a Belgian former professional footballer who played as a centre-back.

Career
He joined to KM Torhout in 2005, where he came from Club Brugge. de Ly left after four years KV Kortrijk and signed in August 2010 with FCV Dender EH.

References

External links

1984 births
Living people
Belgian footballers
Belgian Pro League players
K.V. Kortrijk players
Footballers from Bruges
Association football defenders
Club Brugge KV players
F.C.V. Dender E.H. players